Darker Than Silence is the sixth studio album by South African gothic rock band The Awakening, released in 2004.

Recording
In 2004 The Awakening began to work on its most ambitious album by far, titled as Darker Than Silence, with lyrical themes about devastation and medication. The album is characterized by "riffing guitars, metronomic synth drums, industrial rhythms, alternately eerie and delicate keyboards, and that enthralling guttural voice." Songs such as "One More Crucifixion", "Angelyn", and "The Needle and The Gun" achieved a positive reception worldwide, and notable success on South African, United States, and German Charts. Nils van der Linden of iafrica.com gave the album 4 out of 5 and wrote that "Darker Than Silence is easily the most fully realised album from The Awakening" and that "Nyte hasn’t lost his ability to write melodies that are both beautiful and instantly memorable. Just listen to the delicate keyboard parts beneath the wall of guitars on "Angelyn" — easily the band’s most spellbinding love song since "Maree"."

Track listing
All songs written by Ashton Nyte.
"Death Says Yes"
"One More Crucifixion"
"The Needle and the Gun"
"Frozen Icon"
"Gospel Song"
"The Man Who Wasn't There"
"Angelyn"
"Armageddon Style"
"Deprivation (part 1)"
"Self"
"The Chosen"
"Animal"
"Page 3"
"Faith Falling?"
"Traffic"

References

The Awakening (band) albums
2004 albums